Pakistan Locomotive Factory (or PLF) is a manufacturer of locomotives for Pakistan Railways, located in Risalpur, Khyber Pakhtunkhwa, Pakistan. The company was established in 1993. A total of 2,130 coaches have been manufactured at Carriage Factory Islamabad since 1971. The factory had overhauled 1,039 coaches up to 30 June 2015.

History
Its function is to manufacture indigenous diesel electric locomotives and electric locomotives, thus allowing Pakistan Railways to have less dependency on foreign technology.

In January 2016, the Minister for Railways, Khawaja Saad Rafique announced that Pakistan Locomotive Factory is to enter a joint venture with private sector participation.

Function
The designed production capacity of the factory is 25 diesel electric locomotives per year. The production capacity can however be increased by introducing double shifts. Technology for manufacturing of locomotives have been acquired over the years from Hitachi, General Electric, Adtranz and Dalian Locomotive and Rolling Stock Works. The factory has manufactured a total of 102 new diesel electric locomotives of 2000-3000 horsepower for Pakistan Railways since 1993. 26 overage locomotive of 2000-2400 horsepower have also been rehabilitated. Different spare parts of locomotives are also being manufactured.

Projects

Current
 75 DE locomotives from General Electric, comprising:
 55 CBUs of 4000 hp
 2 CBUs of 2000 hp
 18 CKDs of 2000 hp
 Locomotive Rehabilitation Project MGPR

Completed
 23 DE locomotives (2000 hp, Hitachi), 1993-97, Class PHA 20 
 Rehabilitation of 5 DE locomotives (2000 hp, GE), 1997–98, Class RGE 20 
 30 DE locomotives (3000 hp, GE & Adtranz), 1999-01, Class AGE 30 
 Rehabilitation of 21 DE locomotives (2000/2400 hp, GE), 2001-03, Class RGE 24 
 25 DE locomotives (2000 hp, Chinese), 2003–08, Class DPU 20 
 44 DE locomotives (3000 hp, Chinese), 2003–08, Class DPU 30 
 5 DE locomotives (3000 hp, Chinese), 2014–15

Abbreviations
 CBU = Completely built unit (locomotives supplied fully assembled)
 CKD = Complete knock down (locomotives supplied in kit form and assembled locally)
 DE = Diesel-electric
 hp = Horsepower

Note
There are some disagreements between sources irfca.org  and pakistanrail.com .  For example, on horsepower of Class DPU 30. There are also minor differences in building dates.

See  also
 Locomotives of Pakistan
 Pakistan Railways Carriage Factory
 Moghalpura Railway Workshops

References 

Locomotive manufacturers of Pakistan
Rolling stock manufacturers of Pakistan
Government-owned companies of Pakistan
Manufacturing companies established in 1993
Pakistani companies established in 1993